Botad Junction railway station is a railway station serving Botad town, in Botad district of Gujarat State of India. It is under Bhavnagar railway division of Western Railway zone of Indian Railways.

, a single diesel broad gauge railway line exists and at this station, 34 trains halt, two trains originate and two trains terminate.

Trains

The following trains halt at Botad Junction in both directions:

 12945/46 Surat–Mahuva Superfast Express
 22993/94 Bandra Terminus–Mahuva Superfast Express
 22989/90 Bandra Terminus–Mahuva Express
 22935/36 Bandra Terminus–Palitana Express
 12941/42 Parasnath Express
 19259/60 Kochuveli–Bhavnagar Express
 17203/04 Bhavnagar Terminus–Kakinada Port Express
 12971/72 Bandra Terminus–Bhavnagar Terminus Express
 22963/64 Bandra Terminus–Bhavnagar Terminus Weekly Superfast Express
 19107/08 Bhavnagar Terminus–Udhampur Janmabhoomi Express
 19579/80 Bhavnagar Terminus–Delhi Sarai Rohilla Link Express

References

Railway stations in Botad district
Bhavnagar railway division
Railway junction stations in Gujarat